The radiate carpal ligament is a group of about seven fibrous bands which diverge in all directions on the palmar surface of the carpal bones.  The majority of the bands radiate from the capitate to the scaphoid, lunate, and triquetral bones.

Upper limb anatomy
Ligaments